Claus Michael Kauffmann, FBA (born 5 February 1931) was Director of the Courtauld Institute, London, from 1985–95. He was succeeded by Eric Fernie. Kauffmann is a Fellow of the British Academy.

Kauffmann was educated at Clitheroe Royal Grammar School and St Paul's School, London, before matriculating at Merton College, Oxford in 1950, where he read history. After graduation he took up a Junior Research Fellowship at the Warburg Institute, completing his PhD in the History of Art in 1957. He then held posts at the Warburg Institute, Manchester City Art Gallery, and the Victoria and Albert Museum.

Kauffmann married Dorothea Hill in 1954.

Selected publications
The Baths of Pozzuoli. A study of the medieval illuminations of Peter of Eboli's poem, Bruno Cassirer, Oxford, 1959. 
The Legend of St. Ursula. [A survey based on the painting “The Martyrdom of St. Ursula and the Eleven Thousand Virgins” in the Victoria and Albert Museum and other works. With reproductions.], Victoria & Albert Museum, London, 1964.
The Barbizon school, Victoria & Albert Museum, London, 1965.
Paintings at Apsley House, Victoria & Albert Museum, London, 1965.
An altar-piece of the Apocalypse from Master Bertram's Workshop in Hamburg, Victoria & Albert Museum, London, 1968.
Romanesque MSS 1066-1190, Harvey Miller, London, 1975.
Paintings, water-colours and miniatures, Victoria & Albert Museum, London, 1978.  
John Varley: 1778-1842, Batsford in association with the Victoria & Albert Museum, 1984.  
Biblical imagery in medieval England 700-1550, Harvey Miller Publishers, London, 2002.

References

 

 
 
 

Directors of the Courtauld Institute of Art
1931 births
English art historians
Living people
Fellows of the Society of Antiquaries of London
People associated with the Victoria and Albert Museum
Fellows of the British Academy
Alumni of Merton College, Oxford